Alora  is a genus of predatory sea snails, marine prosobranch gastropod mollusks in the family Epitoniidae, commonly known as wentletraps.

Species
According to the World Register of Marine Species, the following species with valid names are included within the genus Alora  :
 Alora annulata (Kuroda & Ito, 1961)
 Alora gouldii (A. Adams, 1857)
 Alora kiiensis Nakayama, 2000
 Alora rapunculus Kilburn, 1975
 Alora retifera Bouchet & Warén, 1986
 Alora tenerrima (Dautzenberg & H. Fischer, 1896)
 Alora turbinata Poppe, 2008
Species brought into synonymy 
 Alora billeeana (DuShane & Bratcher, 1965) : synonym of Epidendrium billeeanum (DuShane & Bratcher, 1965)
 Alora insignis (Pilsbry & Lowe, 1932): synonym of  Alora gouldii (A. Adams, 1857)
 Alora reticulata (Habe, 1962): synonym of Foratiscala reticulata (Habe, 1962)

References

  dams H. 1861. Description of a new genus of shells from the collection of Hugh Cuming, Esq. Proceedings of the Zoological Society of London, 1860: 272-273
 Gofas, S.; Le Renard, J.; Bouchet, P. (2001). Mollusca, in: Costello, M.J. et al. (Ed.) (2001). European register of marine species: a check-list of the marine species in Europe and a bibliography of guides to their identification. Collection Patrimoines Naturels, 50: pp. 180–213

Epitoniidae